The Northern California Athletic Conference (NCAC) was an NCAA Division II college athletic association that sponsored American football that was founded in 1925. It disbanded in 1998 after the majority of its member schools were forced to drop football.

History
The NCAC was founded as the Far Western Conference (FWC) in 1925 by its charter member schools: Fresno State, Saint Mary's, UC Davis, Nevada, San Jose State and Pacific.

Nevada's departure from the conference in 1940 left the conference with only four members; Chico State, Fresno State, College of the Pacific and UC Davis. The conference looked to four nominees in Humboldt State, San Francisco State, Santa Barbara State and California Poly of San Luis Obispo.

Shortly after World War II, all of these charter members, with the exception of UC Davis, would leave for other conferences, to be replaced by San Francisco State, Sacramento State, Hayward State, Southern Oregon, Sonoma State and Chico State. During the 1990s, each of the universities associated with the California State system chose to disband their football teams in order to comply with Title IX, with the exception of Humboldt State, which added two women's sports to achieve compliance and Sacramento State.

Members

Membership timeline

Conference champions

Football

 1925: Saint Mary's
 1926: Saint Mary's
 1927: Saint Mary's
 1928: Saint Mary's
 1929: Cal Aggies
 1930: Fresno State
 1931:  No champion
 1932: Nevada & San Jose State
 1933: Nevada
 1934: San Jose State & Fresno State
 1935: Fresno State
 1936: Pacific (CA)
 1937: Fresno State
 1938: Pacific (CA)
 1939: Nevada
 1940: Pacific (CA)
 1941: Pacific (CA)
 1942: Pacific (CA)
 1943: No champion
 1944: No champion
 1945: No champion
 1946: No champion
 1947: Cal Aggies & 
 1948: 

 1949: Cal Aggies
 1950: San Francisco State
 1951: Cal Aggies
 1952: Humboldt State
 1953: Chico State
 1954: San Francisco State
 1955: No champion
 1956: Cal Aggies, San Francisco State, & Humboldt State 
 1957: San Francisco State
 1958: San Francisco State
 1959: San Francisco State
 1960: Humboldt State
 1961: Humboldt State & San Francisco State
 1962: San Francisco State
 1963: UC Davis, Humboldt State, & San Francisco State
 1964: Sacramento State
 1965: San Francisco State
 1966: Sacramento State
 1967: San Francisco State
 1968: Humboldt State
 1969: Cal State Hayward
 1970: Cal State Hayward & Chico State
 1971: UC Davis & Chico State
 1972: UC Davis

 1973: UC Davis & Chico State
 1974: UC Davis
 1975: UC Davis
 1976: UC Davis
 1977: UC Davis
 1978: UC Davis
 1979: UC Davis
 1980: UC Davis
 1981: Cal State Hayward & UC Davis
 1982: UC Davis
 1983: UC Davis
 1984: UC Davis
 1985: UC Davis
 1986: UC Davis
 1987: UC Davis
 1988: UC Davis
 1989: UC Davis
 1990: UC Davis
 1991: Sonoma State
 1992: UC Davis
 1993: Chico State
 1994: Chico State, Humboldt State, & Sonoma State
 1995: Humboldt State
 1996: Chico State

Baseball
1983: San Francisco State
1990: Sonoma State
1991: Sonoma State
1992: Sonoma State
1998: Sonoma State

Women's volleyball
1995: Sonoma State
1997: Sonoma State

Men's soccer
1974: Cal-State Hayward
1975: Cal-State Hayward 
1976: Cal-State Hayward 
1977: 
1978: 
1979: 
1980: 
1981: 
1982: Cal-State Hayward
1983: Cal-State Hayward
1984: Cal-State Hayward
1985: Chico State
1986: Chico State
1987: Chico State
1988: Cal-State Hayward
1989: Cal-State Hayward
1990: Sonoma State
1991: Sonoma State
1993: Sonoma State
1995: Sonoma State
1996: Sonoma State
1997: Sonoma State

Women's soccer
1982: 
1983: Cal-State Hayward
1984: Cal-State Hayward
1985: Cal-State Hayward
1986: Cal-State Hayward
1987: Cal-State Hayward
1988: Cal-State Hayward (** National Champions **)

Women's basketball
1998: Sonoma State

See also
 List of defunct college football conferences
 California Coast Conference (1922–1928)

References

 
Sports organizations established in 1925
1998 disestablishments in California